An Jung-sik (안중식, 1861-1919), pen name Simjeon (심전),  was an artist who lived at the very end of the  Joseon period. He was a key person to pursue the transition that started from the "true view landscape" of Jeong Seon (1676-1759) towards the nowadays way of handling the fine arts (미술) in both Korea's.

Life and legacy

An Jung-sik was born in Seoul and studied painting under Jang Seung-eop (1843-1897), who often went by the pen name Owon. Together with Jo Seok-jin (1853-1920), he was a draughtsman attached to the 1881 Joseon embassy to China. During this one-year sojourn, he studied Chinese and the next coming painting trends. In 1900, he painted the royal portrait of King Gojong.

In 1911, following the Japanese colonization of Korea, the Dohwaseo Bureau of Painting was dissolved. Then Yun Yeong-ki (1833-?) established the Gyeongseong Seohwa Misul-won 경성 서화 미술원 (Seoul Calligraphy and Fine Arts School).  The name of this school was the first use of the term 'misul' for fine arts in Korea. Leading members of the faculty were An Jung-sik and Jo Seok-jin (1853-1920).

Among the alumni of the Seohwa Misul-won were Kim Eun-ho 김은호 (1892-1979), Yi Sang-beom (1897-1972), No Su-hyeon (1899-1980), Park Seung-mu (1893-1980), Choi Wu-seok (1899-1965), all important figures in Korean modern Art.

In 1918, An Jung-sik organized the Seohwa Hyeobhoe 서화협회 (Association of Painting and Writing Artists). At his death, An was succeeded as president of the association by Jo Seok-jin.

The annual exhibitions held from 1913 by the Seohwa Misul-won (and thereafter by the Seohwa Hyeobhoe) were a leading event in the Korean Fine Art sphere. For this reason, the occupying Government-General organised a concurrent event (Joseon Art Exhibitions) from 1922 onwards, before closing the Seohwa Misul-won Exhibitions in 1936.

An Jung-sik died in 1919. As a proof of his success in enforcing the new trends, he was, together with Jo Seok-jin, criticised one year later for "his paintings were conservative, lacking vitality and must be reborn" (Byeong Young-ro, Theory of Eastern Style Painting, 1920).

Spring Dawn at Mt. Baegak

Among An Jung-sik's main works, is the twofold painting: 
"Spring Dawn at Mt. Baegak" (Baegakchunhyo, 백악춘효), Registered Cultural Heritage No. 485. Drawing several views of the same landscape according to the seasons (chun=spring, ha, chu, dong) is a recurrent theme across the centuries (e.g. the famous Eight views of the Four Seasons by An Gyeon).

But this twofold painting is slightly different. One panel is '여름본' Summer (more yellow tone, with two tigers), the other is '가을본' Fall (more brown tone, with only one tiger). Both can be seen at National Museum of Korea. First of all, this painting is remarquable by the way it mixes  composition and strokes from the traditional Joseon heritage with the Western trends, especially the use of perspective (mathematical projective geometry).

 

On the upper left corner of the yellow tone painting, one can read the Chinese inscription '白岳春曉' (=백악춘효) meaning 'Dawn of Spring facing Mount Baekak'. Next to it, a little smaller, is written  乙卯 夏日 (=을묘하일, Eul-myo Ha-il) i.e. summer 1915, followed by '心田安中植' (=심전 안중식) i.e. An Jung-sik. On the brown tone painting, the second part of inscription is modified into 乙卯 秋日 (=을묘추일, Eul-myo Chu-il) i.e. autumn 1915.

This raise the question: why does the painter wrote down 'Eulmyo in the fall' on the painted work 'Springtime dawn of Baekak'?. An answer can be found in the fact that in 1915, a 'Korea Trade Fair' was held on the premise of the Gyeongbok Palace by the Japanese Government-General. This leads to the demolition of many buildings in the palace complex, preparing the erection (1916-1926) of the massive Japanese General Government Building.
In this context, Mount Baekak and even the Gwanghwamun Gate were only a pretext, the true topic being the destruction of the right 'tiger' in the frontview. This 'tiger' was not a simple decorative bloc of stone, but an haetae 해태, i.e. a mythical creature serving as a fengshui guardian against natural disasters and a symbol of law and order. In this case, the two-fold painting was about Summer and Fall of the invaded Korea.

Gallery

Another great painting is a 10-panels folding screen:

 Other well known paintings are:

References

Bibliography

External links

 gongu.copyright.or.kr lists 188 entries for An Jungsik

1861 births
1919 deaths
19th-century Korean painters
20th-century Korean painters